SS-Bewerber or Staffel-Bewerber ("SS-Applicant") was an SS rank used in Nazi Germany from 1933 to 1945. The rank of SS-Bewerber was the lowest possible SS rank and was assigned to those personnel who were candidates in the SS. The rank was most often used in the Allgemeine-SS as a prelude to appointment as an SS-Anwärter.

Within the Allgemeine-SS, the rank of SS-Bewerber was (more often than not) used simply as an administrative title while a background investigation was being conducted on a potential SS member. Typically this would involve a criminal history check, political reliability screening, and investigation into the prospective SS member's racial background.

The rank of SS-Bewerber was also occasionally used in the Waffen-SS, but merely as a title for an SS recruit who had yet to report for initial in-processing and basic training. An SS-Bewerber was rarely issued a uniform or any type of insignia. In the few cases where a uniform was provided, a basic SS uniform would be worn without any insignia.

Notes

Bibliography 
 

SS ranks